Forrest Airport  is an airport located in the hamlet of Forrest, Western Australia. The airport is clearly visible from the Indian Pacific train, which services the Trans-Australian Railway.

History
The airport was built by the Department of Civil Aviation in 1929 as a fuel stop for West Australian Airways which had won a government contract to carry mail between Adelaide and Perth using the de Havilland Hercules.
In the 1930s the Douglas airliner Bungana, also known as the mail plane, was a regular visitor on interstate flights.

During World War II it was operated by the Royal Australian Air Force as a transit and fuel stop, and a communications base. and has been the site of various military visits to the location over time.

Current usage

It remains in use as an important stopping place for refuelling short range planes, for the Royal Flying Doctor Service and the Australian Defence Force.

See also
 List of airports in Western Australia
 Aviation transport in Australia

References

External links
 Airservices Aerodromes & Procedure Charts
 Forrest Airport WA archived version – compiled by Geoff Goodall

Airports in Western Australia
Goldfields-Esperance
Nullarbor Plain